Alfaroa is a genus of evergreen trees in the Juglandaceae family of the Fagales, growing in montane and submontane tropical rain forests in Central America.  The wood is characterized by solid pith, pink heartwood, and vessels with scalariform perforations, as well as simple perforations.

Description
The (usually pinnately compound) leaves are evergreen and lack stipules.  They are alternate, rarely opposite.

The plants are monoecious, the male flowers being in lateral panicles (several pairs of catkins on an inflorescence) and the female flowers born terminally either in a single spike or in a hermaphroditic panicle including several paired male catkins.  Each flower has a wide bract, two bracteoles, and four sepals.  The flowers are sessile.  The male flowers have a round or oblong receptacle and six to ten stamens.  The pollen grains are approximately 24 micrometers in diameter and are slightly triangular in polar view.

The small fruits are nuts, one-chambered at the apex and eight-chambered (sometimes four-chambered) at the base.  Germination is hypogeal.

Species
Alfaroa includes the following species (This list may be incomplete):
 A. columbiana, G. Lozano-C., J. Hernandez-C., & S. Espinal-T.
 A. costaricensis, Standl. —Campano Chile, Chiciscua, Gaulin, Gavilancillo
 A. guanacastensis, D. E. Stone
 A. guatemalensis, (Standl.) L. O. Williams & A. Molina 1970
 A. hondurensis, L.O. Williams 1959
 A. manningii, Jorge Leon
 A. mexicana, D. E. Stone
 A. roxburghiana (Wall.) I. A. Iljinsk.
 A. williamsii, A. Modina R.

A. guatemalensis and A. roxburghiana were originally described as belonging to the genus Engelhardia.  The monotypic genus Alfaropsis I. A. Iljinsk has also been erected for A. roxburghiana.

References

Elliott, L. L., Mindell, R. A., & Stockey, R. A., "Beardia vancouverensis Gen. et Sp. Nov. (Juglandaceae): Permineralized Fruits from the Eocene of British Columbia", American Journal of Botany 93(4): 557–565, 2006

Manchester, Steven R., "Fossil Wood of the Engelhardieae (Junglandaceae) from the Eocene of North America:  Engelhardioxylon Gen. Nov.", Bot. Gasz 144(1)157-163, 1983.

J. A. Vozzo (ed.) Tropical Tree Seed Manual "Part II—Species Descriptions", USDA Forest Service

 
Engelhardioideae
Fagales genera
Neotropical realm flora
Taxonomy articles created by Polbot